Casville is an unincorporated community in Caswell County, North Carolina, United States, located at the crossroads of U.S. Route 158 and Ashland Rd/Park Springs Rd. Travelers along US 158 notice a drastic change in the speed limit from 55 mph (88.5 km/h) to 35 mph (56.3 km/h) as they approach the community's only caution traffic signal; the speed limit returns to  after leaving the crossroads area. Casville has two gas stations for those traveling along US 158 between Yanceyville, North Carolina and Reidsville, North Carolina. It even has a restaurant which opens and closes often, and churches and a volunteer fire department. Neighboring communities include Pelham and Ruffin.

References

External links

Unincorporated communities in Caswell County, North Carolina
Unincorporated communities in North Carolina